"Forgiven" is the first Christian radio single from Relient K's fifth album, Five Score and Seven Years Ago and was released just days before the lead single. The song was officially released to Christian radio somewhere around December 1, 2006, but could be heard on radio as early as November 24th. This song can be heard on Gotee Records website  as of November 28. The band also made the song available via their MySpace on December 1, 2006.

The song was inspired by a situation from Matthew Thiessen's life.

"Forgiven" peaked at #13 on the Hot Christian charts. It was the fourth most played Christian Hit Radio song in 2007 according to R&R magazine. The song is currently Relient K's sixth most popular song on iTunes.

The song was also included in the compilation album WOW Hits 2008.

References

2006 singles
Relient K songs
Songs written by Matt Thiessen
Song recordings produced by Howard Benson
2006 songs
Capitol Records singles
Gotee Records singles